Roman Viktorovich Borisov (born 4 August 1981) is a former Russian professional football player.

Club career
He played in the Russian Football National League for FC Avangard Kursk in 2005.

External links
 

1981 births
Sportspeople from Sochi
Living people
Russian footballers
Association football defenders
FC Zhemchuzhina Sochi players
FC Lada-Tolyatti players
FC Baltika Kaliningrad players
FC Orenburg players
FC Avangard Kursk players
FC SKA Rostov-on-Don players
FC Spartak Kostroma players